Arab Palestine Organization is a former Palestinian political faction. It was formed in 1969, when the Nasserist wing of the Popular Front for the Liberation of Palestine - General Command (PFLP-GC) split from the group. On August 5, official sources from the Palestine Liberation Organization confirmed that the group - led by Ahmad Zarur - had joined the Palestine Armed Struggle Command. According to a declassified CIA document, the group had around fifty members. In August 1969, the APO claimed responsibility for bombing the Israeli pavilion at the International Fair in İzmir, Turkey.

In the summer of 1970, the group attracted controversy as it, along with another Nasserist group, the Action Organization for the Liberation of Palestine, briefly expressed sympathy for the Rogers Plan - which was proposed to reduce belligerence between the Arab states and Israel after the Six-Day War. This approach was however, withdrawn. There were some reports that the controversy sparked clashes with other Palestinian factions, such as Democratic Front for the Liberation of Palestine (DFLP) and the Popular Front for the Liberation of Palestine (PFLP). The APO claimed that the PFLP had attacked their office in Lebanon. The accusation was however withdrawn at a meeting of Palestinian factions.

References

Arab nationalism in the Palestinian territories
Arab nationalist militant groups
Arab Nationalist Movement breakaway groups
Defunct Palestinian militant groups
Defunct Palestinian political parties
Nasserist political parties